Latona is an unincorporated community in Jasper County, in the U.S. state of Illinois.

History
Latona was laid out in 1869. A post office was established at Latona in 1877, and remained in operation until 1920.

References

Unincorporated communities in Jasper County, Illinois
Unincorporated communities in Illinois